Karl Rose is a football manager.

Karl Rose may also refer to:

Karl Rose (naval officer), German naval officer
Karl Philipp Sebottendorf van der Rose
Carl Rosa, born Karl Rose

See also
Karlos Rosé, Dominican musician
Carl Rose (disambiguation)
Charlie Rose (disambiguation)
Rose (disambiguation)